In San Marino, the standard time is Central European Time (CET; UTC+01:00). Daylight saving time is observed from the last Sunday in March (02:00 CET) to the last Sunday in October (03:00 CEST). This is shared with several other EU member states.

History 
San Marino observed daylight saving time between 1916 and 1920, 1940, 1942 to 1948, and again since 1966.

IANA time zone database 
In the IANA time zone database, San Marino is given one zone in the file zone.tab – Europe/San_Marino. Data for San Marino directly from zone.tab of the IANA time zone database; columns marked with * are the columns from zone.tab itself:

See also 
Time in Europe
List of time zones by country
List of time zones by UTC offset

References

External links 
Current time in San Marino at Time.is